The 9C1 is a family of polymer-framed, short recoil-operated, locked-breech semi-automatic pistols designed and manufactured by FMK Firearms in California.

Design features 
The FMK 9C1 is a polymer-framed short-recoil semiautomatic pistol chambered for the 9×19mm Parabellum. It comes with 14 or 10 round double stacked magazines depending on the local restrictions. Like other pistols on its class, it has a firing pin block, a loaded chamber indicator. and a Glock-style trigger safety. Similar to a Glock and some versions of the Smith & Wesson M&P, it does not incorporate a frame-mounted safety lever.

Dimensionally, it is comparable with a Glock G19, placing it in the same class as the G19, the Springfield Armory XD, Taurus G3, and the Smith & Wesson M&P 9.

Uncommon in pistols, it offers two distinct but interchangeable trigger systems: 

 A double-action-only (DAO) firing mechanism, which also has a magazine lock and is aimed at sales to California and Massachusetts. This magazine lock also causes the magazine to not drop free when you depress the release button.

 A single-action-only (SAO) firing mechanism, which is named Fast Action Trigger (FAT) by the manufacturer. There has been different versions of this trigger, the current one is identified by the number 804 engraved on its left side.

Some of the 2nd generation of the pistol have the bill of rights engraved on the slide. The 9C1 pistol is made in California and is approved for sale in California.  This handgun is not designed to use +P ammunition or low quality reloaded ammunition.

See Also 
 HK USP
 Glock 19
 Walther P99
 Springfield Armory XD

References 

9mm Parabellum semi-automatic pistols
Semi-automatic pistols of the United States